The Riga–Jelgava Railway is a  long,  gauge railway built in the 19th century to connect the cities of Riga and Jelgava. In 1872, an extension was built from Jelgava to Mažeikiai, which connected Riga–Jelgava Railway to the Libau–Romny Railway.

References 

Railway lines in Latvia
Transport in Riga
Jelgava
Railway lines opened in 1868
19th-century establishments in Latvia
5 ft gauge railways in Latvia
1868 establishments in the Russian Empire